Olchowa  (Vil’khova) is a village in the administrative district of Gmina Zagórz, within Sanok County, Subcarpathian Voivodeship, in south-eastern Poland.

The village has a population of 310.

References

Olchowa